Dhingano Bozdar is a town and Union Council of Tando Allahyar District in the Sindh Province of Pakistan. The Union Council has a population of 56,892.

References

Populated places in Tando Allahyar District
Union councils of Sindh
Union councils of Tando Allahyar District